is a sub-kilometer asteroid, classified as near-Earth object of the Apollo group, approximately 30 meters in diameter. It passed less than 1 lunar distance from Earth on 5 March 2014. With an absolute magnitude of 25.7, this asteroid is potentially the largest asteroid to come inside the orbit of the Moon since  on 4 August 2013. The close approach was webcast live by Slooh and Virtual Telescope.

Description 

 came to opposition (furthest elongation in the sky from the Sun) on 15 February 2014, but the asteroid had a very faint apparent magnitude of about 23 and was only 10 degrees from the full moon. The asteroid was discovered on 28 February 2014 by Pan-STARRS at an apparent magnitude of 20 using a  Ritchey–Chrétien telescope.

On 5 March 2014 at 21:00 UT the asteroid passed  from Earth and reached about apparent magnitude 15. At 22:22 UT it passed  from the Moon. By 6 March 2014 18:00 UT, the asteroid was less than 30 degrees from the Sun and dimming significantly.

It has an observation arc of 5 days with an uncertainty parameter of 6. It was removed from the JPL Sentry Risk Table on 5 March 2014 using JPL solution 3 with an observation arc of 5 days. When the asteroid only had an observation arc of 4 days, virtual clones of the asteroid that fit the uncertainty region in the known trajectory showed a 1 in 10 million chance that the asteroid could impact Earth on 4 March 2046. Using the nominal orbit, NEODyS shows that the asteroid will be  from Earth on 4 March 2046.

References

External links 
 Asteroid Will Safely Pass Closer Than Moon Wednesday (NASA 4 March 2014)
 Watch the Close Pass of NEO Asteroid 2014 DX110 Wednesday Night (David Dickinson at Universe Today 4 March 2014)
 ALERT! NEO 2014 DX110 on 5 March (Ian Musgrave at itelescope.net 5 March 2014)
 
 
 

Minor planet object articles (unnumbered)

20140305
20140228